MHM may refer to:

 Maritime Heritage Minnesota, historical society
 Master of Health Management
 Mayer Hoffman McCann P.C., US accountancy firm
 Menstrual hygiene management
 Mi Hazánk Mozgalom - Our Homeland Movement, an Hungarian political party
 Mill Hill Missionaries, a society of apostolic life of Catholic missionaries
 "Mhm", a song by Vince Staples from the album Vince Staples (album)

See also
 Habitation and Logistics Outpost, a space station module also known as the Minimum Habitation Module (MHM)